Modiri FM is a South African community radio station based in the North West.

Coverage areas 
Delarayville
Vryburg
Sannieshof

Broadcast languages
Afrikaans
Tswana
English

Broadcast time
24/7

Target audience
Working Class, and Farm Workers
LSM Groups 6 - 8
Age Group 16 - 80

Programme format
40% Talk
60% Music

Listenership Figures

References

External links
 Official Website
 SAARF Website

Community radio stations in South Africa
Mass media in North West (South African province)